Sundadanio echinus is a danionin in the family Cyprinidae. It is endemic to Borneo and found in West Kalimantan (Indonesia) and western Sarawak (Malaysia). It lives in peat swamps and blackwater streams.

Sundadanio echinus reaches a maximum size of  standard length.

References

Sundadanio
Endemic fauna of Borneo
Freshwater fish of Borneo
Freshwater fish of Indonesia
Freshwater fish of Malaysia
Taxa named by Kevin W. Conway
Taxa named by Maurice Kottelat
Taxa named by Heok Hui Tan
Fish described in 2011